Jane Egerton, Countess of Bridgewater (c.1656 – 23 May 1716), was the second wife of John Egerton, 3rd Earl of Bridgewater. She was a daughter of Charles Paulet, 1st Duke of Bolton, by his second wife Mary Scrope.

Jane had nine children with the 3rd Earl:

Charles Egerton, Viscount Brackley (7 May 1675 – April 1687)
Lady Mary Egerton (14 May 1676 – 11 April 1704). Married William Byron, 4th Baron Byron
Hon. Thomas Egerton (15 August 1679 – April 1687) 
Scroop Egerton, 1st Duke of Bridgewater (11 August 1681 – 11 January 1744/5)
Hon. William Egerton (1684–1732), MP and soldier
Hon. Henry Egerton, Bishop of Hereford (10 February 1689 – 1 April 1746), who married Elizabeth Ariana Bentinck, a daughter of William Bentinck, 1st Earl of Portland. They were the parents of John Egerton, Bishop of Durham.
Hon. John Egerton (d. c.1707), a Page of Honour
Hon. Charles Egerton (1694-1725), who married Catherine Greville, a sister of William Greville, 7th Baron Brooke.
Lady Elizabeth Egerton, who married Thomas Paget, Lord Paget, a son of Henry Paget, 1st Earl of Uxbridge and his wife Mary Catesby. They were the parents of Henry Paget, 2nd Earl of Uxbridge.

The eldest son, Viscount Brackley, and his younger brother Thomas, died aged 11 and 7 respectively, along with their private tutor, in a fire which destroyed the family's London home of Bridgwater House. Both boys were buried on 14 April 1687 at Little Gaddesden, Hertfordshire. This left a younger brother, Scroop, as the heir to the earldom.

Following her husband's death, Jane was known by the title "Dowager Countess of Bridgewater". In 1724 a controversy arose over the distribution of property in her will, causing her daughter Elizabeth to instigate a court case.

References

1650s births
1716 deaths
English countesses
Jane
Daughters of British dukes
Jane
17th-century English nobility
18th-century English nobility
17th-century English women
18th-century English women